Qurtan (also Romanized as Qūrtān; also known as Ghoortan, Qurtūn, and Urūn) is a village in Gavkhuni Rural District, Bon Rud District, Isfahan County, Isfahan Province, Iran. At the 2006 census, its population was 1,177, in 318 families.

References 

Populated places in Isfahan County